Queen Mary Hospital or Queen Mary's Hospital may refer to:

Canada
Queen Mary Hospital, a hospital in Toronto, now part of West Park Healthcare Centre

Hong Kong
Queen Mary Hospital (Hong Kong), a public district general hospital in Pok Fu Lam, Hong Kong
Queen Mary Hospital station, a proposed MTR station

New Zealand
Queen Mary Hospital (Hanmer Springs), South Island
Queen Mary Hospital, Dunedin, defunct hospital in Dunedin, South Island

United Kingdom
Queen Mary's Hospital, Roehampton, London
Queen Mary's Hospital, Sidcup, South East London
Queen Mary's Hospital, Carshalton, London (former)
Queen Mary's Hospital for the East End, Stratford, London (former)

See also
 Queen Mary (disambiguation)
 QMH (disambiguation)